Raikov’s theorem, named for Russian mathematician Dmitrii Abramovich Raikov, is a result in probability theory. It is well known that if each of two independent random variables ξ1 and ξ2 has a Poisson distribution, then their sum ξ=ξ1+ξ2 has a Poisson distribution as well. It turns out that the converse is also valid.

Statement of the theorem 
Suppose that a random variable ξ  has Poisson's distribution and admits a decomposition as a sum ξ=ξ1+ξ2 of two independent random variables. Then the distribution of each summand is a shifted Poisson's distribution.

Comment 
Raikov's theorem is similar to Cramér’s decomposition theorem. The latter result claims that if a sum of two independent random variables has normal distribution, then each summand is normally distributed as well. It was also proved by Yu.V.Linnik that a convolution of normal distribution and Poisson's distribution possesses a similar property.

An extension to locally compact Abelian groups 
Let   be a locally compact Abelian group. Let .

The Poisson distribution generated by the measure  is defined as a shifted distribution of the form

One has the following

Raikov's theorem on locally compact Abelian groups 
Let  be the Poisson distribution generated by the measure . If  is either an infinite order element, or has order 2, then  is also a Poisson's distribution. In the case of  being an element of finite order  ,  can fail to be a Poisson's distribution.

References 

Characterization of probability distributions
Probability theorems
Theorems in statistics